Rhododendron crassifolium is a species of tropical rhododendron, a perennial flowering plant belonging to the family Ericaceae.

Description
Leaves are dark green, broad, ribbed and elliptic. The bell-shaped flowers are red-orange. The flowering period extends from June through August.

Distribution
This plant is native to Sabah, Malaysia on the island of Borneo.

Habitat
This species is typical of the shaded mountain forests. It prefers acidic, well-drained, organic soil in partial sun to partial shade.

References
 George Argent, Anthony Lamb and Anthea Phillipps - The Rhododendrons of Sabah, Malaysian Borneo - Scientific Editor: Wong Khoon Meng
 Biolib
 The Plant List
 Tropicos
 EoL

External links
 
 
 Dixpix
 Rogerstree
 IPNI Listing
 Kew Plant List

crassifolium
Endemic flora of Borneo
Flora of Sabah
Plants described in 1894
Flora of the Borneo montane rain forests